The 1967 Eastern Michigan Hurons football team represented Eastern Michigan University as an independent during the 1967 NCAA College Division football season. In their first season under head coach Dan Boisture, the Hurons compiled a 6–3 record and outscored their opponents, 173 to 77.

Eastern Michigan hired Boisture as its head football coach in July 1967.  Boisture later commented that he was willing to go to a smaller school, saying, "There weren't many jobs open . . . Joan and I looked at the campus. It was a cute campus." Under his leadership, the team produced the longest period of sustained success since Elton Rynearson's days. The team posted winning seasons in all seven years of Boisture's coaching, including a 13-game winning streak that remains a school record.

Schedule

References

Eastern Michigan
Eastern Michigan Eagles football seasons
Eastern Michigan Hurons football